David Willfred Michael Jennings  (born 13 July 1944) was the Anglican Bishop of Warrington from 2000 until he resigned with effect from 31 October 2009.

Education
Jennings was educated at Radley College and trained for the priesthood at King's College London before embarking on a curacy at Walton-on-the-Hill, Liverpool.

Career
Jennings was made a deacon at Trinity 1967 (21 May) by Laurie Brown, Bishop of Warrington, at St Nicholas, Blundellsands and ordained a priest at Michaelmas 1968 (29 September) by Stuart Blanch, Bishop of Liverpool, at Liverpool Cathedral.

After a further curacy at Christchurch Priory he became an incumbent at Hythe in 1969. Further pastoral posts led to appointments as the Vicar of St Edwards, Romford and Head of the Board of Governers of the associated St Edwards CofE Comprehensive and St Edwards Junior School, both in Romford. He later becameRural Dean of Havering in 1985 whilst still based primarily at St Edwards and as Archdeacon of Southend in 1992. He was ordained to the episcopate in 2000. An inspirational preacher, he is also a member of the Court of Liverpool University.

References

1944 births
Living people
People educated at Radley College
Alumni of the Theological Department of King's College London
Associates of King's College London
Archdeacons of Southend
Bishops of Warrington
20th-century English Anglican priests
21st-century Church of England bishops